Listed below are  UCI Women's Teams and elite professional women's teams (non-UCI Women's teams) that compete in 2014 women's road cycling events organized by the International Cycling Union (UCI).

UCI Women's Teams

Non-UCI Women's Teams
Teams listed here are elite professional teams, which are not UCI Women's teams. They are however invited to certain races such as Tour Femenino de San Luis and The Women's Tour.

List updated 26 May 2014

References

See also

 2014 in women's road cycling

prof
Women's sport-related lists